The Raven Age are an English heavy metal band formed in London in 2009 by guitarists George Harris and Dan Wright. Harris is the son of Iron Maiden bassist Steve Harris.

History
In 2014, the band recorded and released their self-titled EP before supporting Steve Harris British Lion and Tremonti on separate tours. The band then supported Iron Maiden on The Book of Souls World Tour in 2016.  On 2 August 2016, the band announced that their debut album, Darkness Will Rise, would be released in December 2016, but it was instead released in March 2017. The band supported Anthrax on the Among The Kings European Tour in 2017. They followed by supporting Killswitch Engage and Tremonti on their tours in 2018. The band released their second album, Conspiracy, on 8 March 2019. Conspiracy has received over 130,000 views on YouTube as of 12 June 2019.

Members

Current members
 George Harris – guitars (2009–present)
 Matt Cox – bass, backing vocals (2012–present)
 Jai Patel – drums (2013–present)
 Matt James – lead vocals (2018–present)
 Tommy Gentry – guitars (2022–present)

Former members
 Michael Burrough – lead vocals (2013–2017)
 Dan Wright – guitars (2009–2017)
 Tony Maue – guitars (2017–2022)

Discography

Studio Albums
 Darkness Will Rise (2017)
 Conspiracy (2019)
 Blood Omen (2023)
Compilation Albums
 Exile (2021)
Extended Plays
 The Raven Age (2014)
Singles
 "Fleur de Lis" (2019) – No. 35 Mainstream Rock Songs

References

External links

 

2009 establishments in England
English heavy metal musical groups
English metalcore musical groups
English rock music groups
Musical groups established in 2009
Musical groups from London
Musical quintets